Daniel Marthin (born 31 July 2001) is an Indonesian badminton player affiliated with Djarum club since 2015. He was a champion at the 2019 Asian and World Junior Championships in the boys' doubles event. Marthin was part of Indonesia winning team at the 2020 Thomas Cup.

Career 
Since junior, Marthin has focused on playing in the doubles category. In 2016, he won the U–17 Jakarta Open Junior Championships partnered with Febriana Dwipuji Kusuma. He then won the boys' doubles title with Leo Rolly Carnando at the Astec Open Championships in Jakarta, and later at the Singapore Youth International Series. In 2018, Marthin alongside Indonesia team won the bronze medal at the Asian Junior Championships in Jakarta. Unfortunately, in the individual  boys' doubles, Marthin and Carnando were defeated in the early stage. In the BWF junior circuit, Marthin with his partner Carnando won the boys' doubles title at the Malaysia and India International Junior tournaments. He later joined Indonesia team at the Markham World Junior Championships, and won a mixed team bronze medal. Marthin claimed his first senior International title by winning the Bangladesh International with Carnando. The duo later won the Turkey International. Together with Djarum team, he won the Junior Super League and Pembangunan Jaya Cup. At the Junior Super League, he is able to attract the attention of badminton observers, because of his attractive playing style.

In 2019, Marthin was selected to join the training at the Indonesia National training center. In March, he won a mixed doubles title with Nita Violina Marwah at the Dutch Junior International, and finished as runner-up in the boys' doubles with Leo Rolly Carnando in the German Junior. In May, he and Carnando won the Jaya Raya Junior Grand Prix beating number 1 seed Di Zijian and Wang Chang. The duo also won the Malaysia International Series, and managed to secure the gold medal at the Asian and World Junior Championships. In the team event, he also helps the National team finished as runner-up in Asian Junior and won the Suhandinata Cup after Indonesia juniors defeating China in the final.

In 2021, Marthin started the year as semi-finalists at the Thailand Open with Leo Rolly Carnando. They later stopped in the quarter-finals at the Swiss Open and Spain Masters. They then reached the finals of the Hylo Open, but was defeated by World number 1 Marcus Fernaldi Gideon  and Kevin Sanjaya Sukamuljo in straight game. Marthin made his debut with Indonesia team at the 2020 Thomas Cup. He played two matches in the group stage, and the team won the 2020 Thomas Cup.

In February 2022, Marthin participated in 2022 Badminton Asia Team Championships with Indonesia and lost the title to Malaysia. In March, Marthin and Carnando lost in the quarter-finals All England and Swiss Opens. In May, he won a gold medal in the men's doubles with Carnando and a bronze medal in the men's team at the Southeast Asian Games. In July, Marthin and Carnando clinched their first World Tour title at the Singapore Open by beating Fajar Alfian and Muhammad Rian Ardianto in the final.

2023 
Kicked off the 2023 season, Marthin competing in four Asian tour. He and his partner, Carnando, had to accept early round defeats in the first two tournaments Malaysia and India Opens. They then emerged victorious in the Indonesia and Thailand Masters, entering them to the top 10 of the BWF world rankings.

Awards and nominations

Achievements

Southeast Asian Games 
Men's doubles

World Junior Championships 
Boys' doubles

Asian Junior Championships 
Boys' doubles

BWF World Tour (3 titles, 1 runner-up) 
The BWF World Tour, which was announced on 19 March 2017 and implemented in 2018, is a series of elite badminton tournaments sanctioned by the Badminton World Federation (BWF). The BWF World Tour is divided into levels of World Tour Finals, Super 1000, Super 750, Super 500, Super 300, and the BWF Tour Super 100.

Men's doubles

BWF International Challenge/Series (3 titles) 
Men's doubles

  BWF International Challenge tournament
  BWF International Series tournament

BWF Junior International (4 titles, 1 runner-up) 
Boys' doubles

Mixed doubles

  BWF Junior International Grand Prix tournament
  BWF Junior International Challenge tournament
  BWF Junior International Series tournament
  BWF Junior Future Series tournament

Performance timeline

National team 
 Junior level

 Senior level

Individual competitions

Junior level 
Boys' doubles

Senior level

Men's doubles

Mixed doubles

References

External links 
 

2001 births
Living people
Sportspeople from Jakarta
Indonesian male badminton players
Competitors at the 2021 Southeast Asian Games
Southeast Asian Games bronze medalists for Indonesia
Southeast Asian Games medalists in badminton
Southeast Asian Games gold medalists for Indonesia
21st-century Indonesian people